Events from the year 1959 in South Korea.

Incumbents
President: Rhee Syng-man
Vice President: Chang Myon

Events
July 17 – Busan Municipal Stadium stampede, 67 persons died after heavy rain triggered a rush towards the upper areas of the stadium, according to National Police Agency of South Korea.
December 1 – Hana Bank, present day of Hana Financial Group was founded.

Births

 March 26 - Shin Jae-heum.

Deaths

 Woo Jang-choon.

See also
List of South Korean films of 1959
Years in Japan
Years in North Korea

References

 
South Korea
Years of the 20th century in South Korea
1950s in South Korea
South Korea
South